National Assembly Library of Korea ( Hangul:국회도서관) is a library in Seoul, South Korea. It is located in Yeouido-dong, Yeoungdeungpo-gu. It is the largest Humanities and Social Sciences Library in Korea functioning as both parliamentary and public libraries. The Library manages and preserves the National Assembly records. The Chief Librarian (vice-minister level) is a public official in political service under the Speaker of the National Assembly.

History 
 1952. 2. 20. Opening of the National Assembly Library
 1963. 11. 26. Enactment of the National Assembly Library Act
 1975. 9. 9. Relocation of the Library to the National Assembly building in Yeouido, Seoul
 1988. 2. 20. Opening of the National Assembly Library building
 1997. 12. 31. Establishment of the basic plan for the National Digital Library
 1998. 10. 12. Opening of the Library to the general public (over 20 years of age)
 2000. 3. 11. Signing of the first Agreement of Mutual Cooperation with Yonsei University
 2002. 9. 8. Started opening on Sundays
 2005. 2. 18. Opening the Library to users over 18 years of age
 2006. 8. 16. - 8. 19. Hosting of the 22nd IFLA Annual Conference of the Library and Research Services for Parliaments Section
 2009. 4. 27. National Assembly Archives transferred to the Library
 2009. 6. 3. Extension of opening hours until 10 PM
 2009. 11. 20. Opening of the Dokdo Island Branch
 2010. 1. 28. Signing of the 1000th Agreement on Mutual Cooperation with Hasang Braille Library
 2010. 2. 3. Hosting of "Living Library" event
 2010. 9. 6. - 9. 10. Hosting of the 2010 GLIN Seoul Conference
 2011. 8. 26. Establishment of the Law Library
 2012. 1. 2. Opening of the National Assembly Library mobile service
 2014. 2. 15. Hosting of a Conference with Guest Speaker Ronni Abergel, Founder of the Human Library
 2014. 5. 14. Opening of the Legal Information Center
 2015. 4. 22. - 4. 24. Hosting of the 4th International Conference on Asian Special Libraries
 2015. 6. 4. Opening of the "Parliamentary Information System of the National Assembly and Local Councils"
 2016. 8. 31. Easing of restrictions on use by young people between 12 and 17 years of age

Organization

Users 
  Former and current members as well as staff of the National Assembly
  College students and members of the general public over 18 years of age
  Young people between 12 and 17 years of age with a need to use the collections and services of the National Assembly Library
  Foreign nationals: holders of passports or certificates of alien registration

External links
Official site (English)
Libraries in Seoul

Buildings and structures in Yeongdeungpo District
Libraries in Seoul
Education in Seoul
Legislative libraries